Vlok is a surname. Notable people with the surname include:

 Adriaan Vlok (1937–2023), South African politician
 David Vlok (born 1963), South African actor and athlete
 Gert Vlok Nel (born 1963), South African poet
 Leon Vlok (1929–2015), South African cricketer

Afrikaans-language surnames